Kulkam is a rural locality (a selo) in Kayakentsky District, Republic of Dagestan, Russia. The population was 268 as of 2010.

Geography 
Kulkam is located 9 km northwest of Novokayakent (the district's administrative centre) by road. Kayakent and Shalasi are the nearest rural localities.

Nationalities 
Dargins live there.

References 

Rural localities in Kayakentsky District